John Kenneth Cobb (born 11 February 1950) is a former Australian politician who served as a National Party member of the Australian House of Representatives from November 2001 representing the Division of Parkes, and the Division of Calare from 2007 to 2016 when he retired.

Early life and education
Cobb was born in Bathurst, son of Lee and Mary Cobb, and was raised on the family property near Mount Hope, New South Wales.

Career

Pre-political career
From the 1980s until his candidacy for Federal Parliament, Cobb was active in, and spent three years as president of the New South Wales Farmers Association, a lobby group representing farmers and rural and regional communities. He also continued to farm the family property.

Political career
Cobb was elected to the House of Representatives from the Division of Parkes, a safe National Party seat, at the 2001 federal election.

In July 2005, Cobb was appointed to the ministry as Minister for Citizenship and Multicultural Affairs, but soon after was reshuffled to the community services portfolio.

After Parkes was dramatically altered in a redistribution, Cobb ran for the neighbouring seat of Calare at the 2007 election after the popular independent member Peter Andren retired. The Liberal-National Party Coalition lost the election, but Cobb won Calare handily. He was chosen by new Opposition leader Brendan Nelson to be a member of the shadow ministry, as the spokesperson on regional development and water security. He was re-elected at the 2010 election and in September 2010 was appointed Shadow Minister for Agriculture and Food Security by Opposition leader, Tony Abbott.

Following the 2013 federal election, Cobb nominated as deputy leader of the National Party, but was defeated by Barnaby Joyce, the newly elected member of New England. Cobb was not appointed to the Abbott Ministry.

On 27 February 2016, Cobb announced that he was retiring from politics and would not re-contest the Division of Calare in the 2016 Australian federal election.

Personal life
Cobb in married and has four daughters from his first marriage. He is not related to one of his predecessors as the member for Parkes, Michael Cobb.

References

External links
Parliament of Australia, Hon. John Cobb MP, official Parliament website biography, retrieved January 2008

1950 births
Living people
National Party of Australia members of the Parliament of Australia
Australian monarchists
Members of the Australian House of Representatives for Parkes
Members of the Australian House of Representatives for Calare
Members of the Australian House of Representatives
21st-century Australian politicians
Government ministers of Australia